In enzymology, a N-benzyloxycarbonylglycine hydrolase is an enzyme that catalyzes the chemical reaction

N-benzyloxycarbonylglycine + H2O  benzyl alcohol + CO2 + glycine

Thus, the two substrates of this enzyme are N-benzyloxycarbonylglycine and H2O, whereas its 3 products are benzyl alcohol, CO2, and glycine.

This enzyme belongs to the family of hydrolases, those acting on carbon-nitrogen bonds other than peptide bonds, specifically in linear amides.  The systematic name of this enzyme class is N-benzyloxycarbonylglycine urethanehydrolase. Other names in common use include benzyloxycarbonylglycine hydrolase, Nalpha-carbobenzoxyamino acid amidohydrolase, Nalpha-benzyloxycarbonyl amino acid urethane hydrolase, and Nalpha-benzyloxycarbonyl amino acid urethane hydrolase I.  It has 2 cofactors: zinc,  and Cobalt.

References

 

EC 3.5.1
Zinc enzymes
Cobalt enzymes
Enzymes of unknown structure